Amey Wagh (born 13 November 1987) is an Indian Marathi actor known for films such as Popat, Faster Fene, Muramba, Girlfriend. He was recently seen portraying Kushal in season 2 of Sacred Games and Rasool Sheikh in Asur- Welcome to Your Dark Side.real name, kartik bachate.

Early life 
Wagh studied in Brihan Maharashtra College of Commerce, Pune. He began actively participating in play competitions since he began college. He lived in a joint family in Pune, consisting of around 65 members. His family was in the transport business.

Career 
Wagh is part of the theatre group, Natak Company. He auditioned for the role of Chatur in 3 Idiots (2009) but was rejected. He made his Bollywood debut in 2012 through the movie, Aiyyaa, where he played Nana. He made his marathi film debut through Sangeeta Pusalkar's directorial, Aaicha Gondhal (2008), starring Kuldip Pawar, as his father and Nirmiti Sawant, as his mother.  In 2014, he was in an English play titled The Government Inspector. In the same year he was also seen in Shutter (2014). He was also in the play Bombed in 2015.  The Marathi play, Amar Photo Studio, had Wagh in a lead role. He also starred in two popular Marathi TV serials Dil Dosti Duniyadari and its sequel Dil Dosti Dobara. He also hosted Zee Marathi Awards 2015-Utsav Natyancha Aplya Maitricha along with Pushkaraj Chirputkar.

He hosted the show Super Dancer Maharashtra in 2018. He also co-hosted Jio Filmfare Awards Marathi 2018, alongside Suvrat Joshi. He is part of the YouTube channel Bharatiya Digital Party, where he hosts a celebrity talk show called Casting Couch with Amey & Nipun. He was ranked 5 in the Times of India-Pune's Most Desirable Men list in 2018. His movie, Girlfriend, has released in July 2019. He hosted the food show Mrs.Annapurna (2014) on ETV Marathi and the dance reality show 2 MAD (2017) on Colors Marathi.He has also acted in the movie Mee Vasantrao, which was releasing on 1 May 2020 but is postponed due to the lockdown in India.

Filmography

Films

Television

Plays

Amar Photo Studio
Bombed
Cycle
Dalan
Geli Ekvees Varsha
The Government Inspector
Katyar Kaljat Ghusali
Natasamrat (old)
 Never Mind

Awards
He was awarded Vinod Doshi fellowship in performing arts in 2015. He won the award for Best Actor in a Leading Role (male) in the Filmfare Awards Marathi 2018, for Muramba.

Personal life 
He was born in Pune, Maharashtra. He was in a relationship with Sajiri Deshpande for 13 years before eventually marrying her on 2 July 2017 at Shrutimangal, Pune.

Philanthropy 
He, along with Sunil Barve, donated the money from two shows of Amar Photo Studio to Chief Minister's Relief Fund in 2018.

Media image

References

External links 

Male actors from Pune
Marathi actors
Living people
1987 births
Indian male television actors
21st-century Indian male actors
Male actors in Marathi cinema
Male actors in Marathi television
Male actors in Marathi theatre